The 1995 New York Mets season was the 34th regular season for the Mets. They went 69-75 and finished 2nd in the NL East. They were managed by Dallas Green. They played home games at Shea Stadium.

Offseason
 November 18, 1994: Paul Byrd was traded by the Cleveland Indians with a player to be named later, Jerry Dipoto, and Dave Mlicki to the New York Mets for Jeromy Burnitz and Joe Roa. The Cleveland Indians sent Jesus Azuaje (minors) (December 6, 1994) to the New York Mets to complete the trade.
December 7, 1994: Jarvis Brown was signed as a free agent with the New York Mets.

Regular season
Although the Mets failed to finish above .500 for the fourth consecutive season, their second-place finish was the highest they had placed since 1990.

After three and a half seasons, the Mets parted ways with Bobby Bonilla. The former All-Star turned lightning rod for fan criticism was dealt to the Baltimore Orioles at the trade deadline. Shortly thereafter, the Mets traded their other big acquisition from the infamous 1991-92 offseason and sent pitcher Bret Saberhagen to the Colorado Rockies.

1995 saw the emergence of Rico Brogna, to that point a backup infielder, as a major contributor to the Mets lineup. Installed as the team's first baseman, Brogna led the team with a .289 average while recording 22 home runs and 79 RBI. Second baseman Jeff Kent continued to provide power as he once again reached the 20-home run mark. José Vizcaíno led the team in hits and posted a .287 average. As far as starting pitching went, there was not as much positive to say. Bobby Jones' 10 wins led the team and Dave Mlicki's 9-7 record was the only other plus-.500 mark among Met starters.

Season standings

Record vs. opponents

Opening Day roster
Bobby Bonilla
Rico Brogna
Brett Butler
Carl Everett
Todd Hundley
Jeff Kent
Bret Saberhagen
David Segui
José Vizcaíno

Transactions
April 11, 1995: Brett Butler signed as a free agent with the New York Mets.
May 29, 1995: Jarvis Brown was released by the New York Mets.
June 1, 1995: Aaron Rowand was drafted by the New York Mets in the 40th round of the 1995 amateur draft, but did not sign.
June 5, 1995: Josías Manzanillo was selected off waivers by the New York Yankees from the New York Mets.
July 28, 1995: Bobby Bonilla was traded by the New York Mets with a player to be named later to the Baltimore Orioles for Damon Buford and Alex Ochoa. The New York Mets sent Jimmy Williams (minors) (August 16, 1995) to the Baltimore Orioles to complete the trade.
July 31, 1995: Bret Saberhagen was traded by the New York Mets with a player to be named later to the Colorado Rockies for Juan Acevedo and Arnold Gooch (minors). The New York Mets sent David Swanson (minors) (August 4, 1995) to the Colorado Rockies to complete the trade.
August 18, 1995: Brett Butler was traded by the New York Mets to the Los Angeles Dodgers for Dwight Maness (minors) and Scott Hunter (minors).

Roster

Player stats

Batting
Note: Pos = Position; G = Games played; AB = At bats; H = Hits; Avg. = Batting average; HR = Home runs; RBI = Runs batted in

Other batters
Note: G = Games played; AB = At bats; H = Hits; Avg. = Batting average; HR = Home runs; RBI = Runs batted in

Pitching

Starting pitchers
Note: G = Games pitched; IP = Innings pitched; W = Wins; L = Losses; ERA = Earned run average; SO = Strikeouts

Other pitchers 
Note: G = Games pitched; IP = Innings pitched; W = Wins; L = Losses; ERA = Earned run average; SO = Strikeouts

Relief pitchers 
Note: G = Games pitched; W = Wins; L = Losses; SV = Saves; ERA = Earned run average, SO = Strikeouts

Farm system 

LEAGUE CHAMPIONS: Kingsport

References

External links

1995 New York Mets at Baseball Reference
1995 New York Mets team page at www.baseball-almanac.com

New York Mets seasons
New York Mets
New York Mets
1990s in Queens